Wolfgang Kurt Hermann "Pief" Panofsky (April 24, 1919 – September 24, 2007), was a German-American physicist who won many awards including the National Medal of Science.

Early life
Panofsky was born in Berlin, Germany to a family of art historians Dorothea and Erwin Panofsky. His ancestors were of Jewish descent. He spent much of his early life in Hamburg, where his father was a professor of Art History. From the age of 10, he attended the Johanneum, where he received a classical education involving Latin and Ancient Greek, but little science. At the age of 15, he moved with his family to the United States and entered Princeton University. He graduated with an A.B. in physics from Princeton University, as salutatorian of his class, in 1938 after completing a senior thesis, titled "The construction of a high pressure ionisation chamber", under the supervision of Walker Bleakney. He then received his Ph.D. in physics from the California Institute of Technology in 1942 after completing a doctoral dissertation, titled "A measurement of the value of h/e by the determination of the short wavelength limit of the continuous x-ray spectrum at 20 kV", under the supervision of Jesse W. M. DuMond.  In April 1942 he was naturalized as a U.S. citizen.

Academic career
From 1945 to 1951, Panofsky held an assistant and then associate professorship at the University of California, Berkeley, before permanently establishing himself as Professor of Physics at Stanford University. Between 1961 and 1984, he was the director of the Stanford Linear Accelerator Center and continued to serve as director emeritus until his death. He was also on the board of directors of the Arms Control Association from 1996 until 1999.

Panofsky was a member of the Board of Sponsors of The Bulletin of the Atomic Scientists and won the Matteucci Medal in 1996 for his fundamental contributions to physics. He was also a recipient of the National Medal of Science, the Franklin Medal (1970), the Ernest O. Lawrence Medal, the Leo Szilard Award and the Enrico Fermi Award.

Personal life

During his college days, Panofsky was called "Pief" by fellow students who found his full name unpronounceable.  The childhood nickname seemed to suit the ebullient physicist, and it stayed with him throughout his long life.  His elder brother, Hans A. Panofsky, was "an atmospheric scientist who taught at Pennsylvania State University for 30 years and who was credited with several advances in the study of meteorology".

Panofsky married Adèle Irène DuMond, daughter of his PhD advisor in 1942. Adèle Panofsky was also known at SLAC for her role in the building of the mounted Paleoparadoxia fossil skeleton display at the SLAC Visitors Center.

Awards and Honors 
 Ernest Orlando Lawrence Award (1961)
 California Institute of Technology Alumni Distinguished Service Award (1966)
 California Scientist of the Year Award (1967)
 Elected to the American Academy of Arts and Sciences (1968)
 National Medal of Science (1969)
 Franklin Medal (1970)
 Elected to the National Academy of Sciences (1971)
 Annual Public Service Award, Federation of American Scientists (1973)
 Enrico Fermi Award (1979)
 Leo Szilard Award (1982)
 Shoong Foundation Hall of Fame in Science (1983)
 Elected to the American Philosophical Society (1985)
 Hilliard Roderick Prize (AAAS-1991)
 Honorary doctorates from the Faculty of Mathematics and Science at Uppsala University, Sweden, and from Princeton University
 Matteucei Medal (Rome, 1997)
 International Scientific and Technological Award from the People's Republic of China (2001)

Death
Panofsky died at the age of 88 on September 24, 2007, in Los Altos, California, from a heart attack.
Panofsky stayed active at SLAC until his last day of life. He was survived by his wife of 65 years, Adele Panofsky, their five children, 11 grandchildren and 3 great-grandchildren.

Publications
 Classical Electricity and Magnetism by Wolfgang Panofsky and Melba Phillips (1955, 1962, 1983, 1990)

References

External links
 Michael Schaaf und Hartwig Spitzer: Immediately after the explosion I fell asleep (PDF; 513 kB), Interview mit Wolfgang Panofsky, Arbeitsgruppe Naturwissenschaft und Internationale Sicherheit in der Universität Hamburg, 6. Juli 2006
Obituary in The New York Times
Obituary in The Times, 2 October 2007
W.K.H. Panofsky's SLAC web page
SLAC Archives and History Office Panofsky web page
July 2006 Interview with Dr. Panofsky (PDF)
Peace talk: My life negotiating science and policy by W. K. H. Panofsky (PDF)
 Oral history interview transcript with Wolfgang K.H. Panofsky 15 May 1973, American Institute of Physics, Niels Bohr Library & Archives
 SLAC Director's Office
 
 THE KELVIN ABSOLUTE VOLTMETER and the speed of light, a physics laboratory course experiment whose apparatus was designed by Panofsky
 A measurement of the value of h/e by the determination of the short wavelength limit of the continuous x-ray spectrum at 20kV

See also
Panofsky Prize
 Michael Schaaf und Hartwig Spitzer: Immediately after the explosion I fell asleep (PDF; 513 kB), Interview mit Wolfgang Panofsky, Arbeitsgruppe Naturwissenschaft und Internationale Sicherheit in der Universität Hamburg, 6. Juli 2006

1919 births
2007 deaths
Princeton University alumni
California Institute of Technology alumni
20th-century American physicists
Jewish physicists
Jewish American scientists
Enrico Fermi Award recipients
Members of the United States National Academy of Sciences
Members of the French Academy of Sciences
Foreign Members of the USSR Academy of Sciences
Foreign Members of the Russian Academy of Sciences
Foreign members of the Chinese Academy of Sciences
National Medal of Science laureates
Stanford University Department of Physics faculty
University of California, Berkeley faculty
Accelerator physicists
Manhattan Project people
Recipients of the Matteucci Medal
20th-century American Jews
21st-century American Jews
German emigrants to the United States
Members of the American Philosophical Society
Presidents of the American Physical Society